Atethmia sinuata is a moth of the family Noctuidae. It is found in Iran.

Cuculliinae
Moths of the Middle East
Moths described in 2006